Anna Kristin Webber is a Canadian saxophonist, flutist, and composer of avant-garde jazz based in Brooklyn. A Guggenheim Award-winning composer, Webber has released a number of critically-acclaimed albums as leader or co-leader, and received accolades for her work as saxophonist, flutist, and arranger.

Early life and education

Originally from British Columbia, Webber began her studies at Montreal's McGill University. In 2008, she moved to New York City and began a master's degree at Manhattan School of Music.

In 2010, Webber completed her master's, was awarded the Prix François-Marcaurelle at Montreal's L'OFF Festival, and released her debut album as leader, Third Floor People Don't Need to Worry About Anything. Third Floor People features a cast of seven, with Webber as the fixed constant between two quartets: tracks feature either the "Montreal People" (Erik Hove, Jean-Sebastien Williams, Phil Melanson) or the "New York People" (Matt Holman, Owen Stewart, Fred Kennedy).

Webber moved to Germany in 2011 to study with John Hollenbeck at the Jazz Institut Berlin. Hollenbeck will later became a member of Webber's Simple Trio. Webber first began working on compositions for big band while in the program, and completed her second master's degree in 2012.

Career
From 2013 to 2016, Webber's releases as leader alternated between her Percussive Mechanics septet and her Simple Trio. The self-titled Percussive Mechanics, featuring James Wylie, Elias Stemeseder, Julius Heise, Igor Spallati, Martin Kruemmling, and Max Andrzejewski, was released on Pirouet Records in 2013, with the group's Refraction following two years later. In 2014, Webber was awarded the prestigious BMI Foundation Charlie Parker Jazz Composition Prize and released SIMPLE, the highly-lauded debut of her trio with John Hollenbeck and pianist Matt Mitchell, on Skirl Records. Two years later, Binary was also released to great acclaim.

In 2017, Webber received a New York Foundation for the Arts Canadian Women Artists’ Award, and in 2018 she was awarded a Guggenheim Award for her work in music composition.

Webber's Clockwise (Pi, 2019) introduced a septet with Jeremy Viner, Jacob Garchik, Christopher Hoffman, Matt Mitchell, Chris Tordini, and Ches Smith. The album was included in the top ten of the 2019 NPR Music Jazz Critics Poll.

The Webber/Morris Big Band, co-led with Angela Morris, released its debut Both Are True on Greenleaf Music in April 2020; the album was included in The New York Times 10 Best Jazz Albums of the year and Bandcamp Daily's Best Jazz Albums of 2020. Later that year she also released Rectangles (Out Of Your Head Records), featuring Marc Hannaford, Adam Hopkins, and Mark Ferber. The quartet's record was included among DownBeat'''s Best Albums of 2020.

Webber was a 2021 Berlin Prize Fellow and a featured performer on Remy Le Boeuf's "Strata", a nominee for the 2021 Grammy for Best Instrumental Composition.

Co-led projects include trios Jagged Spheres (with Elias Stemeseder, Devin Gray), The Hero of Warchester (with Nathaniel Morgan, Liz Kosack), and the COVID-recent TAC Trio (with Chris Tordini, Theo Bleckmann), as well as the acronymic quartet EAVE with Erik Hove, Vicky Mettler, and Evan Tighe.

Webber's work is often guided by conceptual constraints. Clockwise, the septet record she composed during the first of her two MacDowell residencies, was informed by John Cage's works for percussion; Binary'' was partly inspired by the now-defunct automated YouTube account Webdriver Torso, and at times directed by the assignation of pitches and intervals to the numbers in Webber's IP address.

Discography

As leader

As co-leader

As sideperson

References

External links 
 Anna Webber's homepage
 Bandcamp

Canadian jazz composers
Canadian jazz saxophonists
Canadian saxophonists
Canadian women composers
Living people
McGill University alumni
Manhattan School of Music alumni
Pirouet Records artists
Women jazz saxophonists
1984 births
21st-century Canadian women musicians
21st-century Canadian composers
21st-century jazz composers
21st-century saxophonists